Journey to the West is a Chinese television series adapted from the 16th-century novel of the same title. The series was directed and produced by Cheng Lidong and starred Zhenxiang, Victor Chen, Xie Ning and Mou Fengbin in the leading roles. It was first aired on Zhejiang Satellite TV (ZJSTV) in China on 14 February 2010. This version is not to be confused with the 2011 television series of the same title produced by Zhang Jizhong.

List of episodes

Cast

Main cast
 Fei Zhenxiang as Sun Wukong
 Victor Chen as Tang Sanzang
 Xie Ning as Zhu Bajie
 Mou Fengbin as Sha Wujing
 Wang Shuai as White Dragon Horse

Other cast
 Note: Some cast members played multiple roles.

 Cecilia Han as White Bone Demoness, White Bird Demoness/ Pian Pian
 Joan Chen as Guanyin
 Tang Guoqiang as Jade Emperor
 Wang Like as Azure Dragon Demon King (Qingling), Ruler of Women's Kingdom
 Liu Jia as Queen Mother of the West, Widow Woman
 Fan Zhiqi as Taishang Laojun
 Zhu Yanfei as Buddha
 Sze Yu as Taibai Jinxing
 Eddie Kwan as Li Jing
 Cao Xiwen as Gao Cuilan
 Yin Xiaotian as Erlang Shen
 Vivian Chen as Princess of India, Jade Rabbit, Su'e
 Xu Huanshan as Subhuti
 Cheng Lidong as Ksitigarbha
 Dong Meng as Bull Demon King
 Yu Na as Albino Rat
 Wu Ma as Elder Jinchi
 Lou Qi as Gao Cai
 Zhu Yongteng as Emperor Taizong of Tang
 Xiaohei as Nezha
 Kira Lu as Jade Rabbit Fairy
 Guo Xiaowei as Single Horned King
 He Jianze as Prince Tianyin
 Miao Haizhong as Marshal Tianpeng
 Liu Ying as Chang'e
 Cheng Sihan as Maitreya
 Zhang Qi as King of Spiritual Touch
 Han Dong as Priest Jinguang
 Diana Pang as Baozhu
 Qiu Ye as Sisi
 Yin Shuo as Miansi
 Xue Jiawen as Xiaoqing, Fairy
 Lu Xueting as Xiaohong, Fairy
 Yu Juan as Xiaohua, Fairy
 Jiang Feiyan as Xiaogao
 Zuo Xiannan as Manjusri, Ai'ai
 Gu Xiao as Samantabhadra
 Zhang-yang Guo'er as Mahasthamaprapta
 Meng Yansen as Stone Monkey, Red Boy, Shancai
 Yan Hongding as Apan
 Sun Hao as Ananda, Fire Star
 Sun Qiang as Mahākāśyapa, Golden Horned King
 Liu Tianyue as Zhenzhen
 Lu Jieyun as Lianlian
 Hong Zhibin as Sun Xiaoxiao
 Wu Tongyu as Hui'an
 Zhang Baijun as Squire Gao
 Xu Songzi as Squire Gao's wife
 Gao Junbao as Squire, Abbot of Jinguang Monastery
 Dai Chunrong as Royal Tutor of Women's Kingdom
 Zhou Shiya as Royal Advisor of Women's Kingdom
 Feng Songsong as Pipa Demoness
 Mu Xintong as General in Women's Kingdom
 Mu Qitong as Guard in Women's Kingdom
 Xu Feifei as Old woman in Women's Kingdom
 Zhang Zhongning as Pilanpo Bodhisattva
 Zhou Jiwei as Black Bear Demon
 Li Baolong as Earth Deity, Multiple Armed Ape, Shiba Gong
 Zhang Mingming as Scholar in White Robe
 Zhou Haodong as Squire Kou
 Liu Zifei as Lady Yao
 Li Guangjun as Monkey King
 Sun Yanbin as Monkey Queen
 Wang Gang as King of Chechi
 Shi Jipu as Royal Advisor of Chechi
 Hou Jie as Tiger Power Immortal, King Yama
 Tian Licheng as Elk Power Immortal
 Yang Jun as Antelope Power Immortal
 Zhou Zhong as Yellow Brows, Duke of Thunder
 Chen Rongwei as Silver Horned King, Juling Shen
 Yin Youting as Meticulous Ghost, Guangmou, Mountain Deity, Courier station master
 Wang-yang Xiaohan as Witty Bug, Mo Lihong
 Feng Xiaoqin as Evil Granny
 Han Yinlong as Dragon King of the East Sea
 Xu Xiaoming as Dragon King of the North Sea
 Chen Chao as Dragon King of the South Sea, Single Horned Devil King
 Tang Gang as Dragon King of the West Sea, Azure Lion King
 Liu Feng as Yellow Toothed Elephant, Serpent General
 Xu Jianghua as Great Peng Demon, Boatman
 Han Bo as Mo Liqing, Marshal Kang
 Zhang Ce as Mo Lihai, Demon King of Confusion, Guangzhi
 Xie Zongchen as Mo Lishou, Hairy Head Star
 Meng Zhicheng as Xiaozhuanfeng
 Wu Bin as Jiruhuo
 Luo Laiheng as Kuairufeng
 Yan Ruipeng as Immortal Ruyi
 Li Jun as Priest
 Zhou Mingyang as Liu Boqin, Arhat Fuhu, Gentleman of Mist
 Tian Xiping as Barefoot Immortal
 Zhang Haiping as Xu Jingyang
 Lü Wangqing as Boy
 Shen Yejun as Guangyi, Shui Bo
 Li Na as Fairy, Diya of Baoxiang
 Liu Zhou as Fairy
 Guo Jinying as Fairy, Princess Iron Fan's servant, Mother of Lightning
 Cao Yuanyuan as Fairy
 Li Shengrong as King of Baoxiang
 Li Yulin as Queen of Baoxiang
 Ye Erjiang as King of India
 Zhao Na as Queen of India
 Fang Zhenhua as Golden Light Gate
 Xie Ruiliang as Silver Head Gate
 Zhou Xin as Almond Immortal
 Jiang Shuying as Dragon Girl
 Ren Xuehai as Lingji Bodhisattva
 Liu Chao as Spotted Fish
 Wang Yi as Jade Faced Vixen
 Qi Shenglin as Chen Qing
 Yu Zikuan as Chen Cheng
 Zhou Xuan as Yipengjin
 Zhou Jia'nan as Chen Guanbao
 Sun Jiali as young Yipengjin
 Liu Zi as Princess Iron Fan
 Feng Jiao as Princess Iron Fan's servant
 Wei Si as Turtle General
 Yao Xiaolong as Golden Dragon of Neck
 Shen Shouhe as Dīpankara Buddha
 Wang Jichao as Earth Deity of Fiery Mountain, Arhat Xianglong
 An Ruiyun as Abbot of Zhenhai Monastery, Immortal Jinding
 Yang Lei as King of Shituo
 Zhang Chao as Marshal Zhang
 Jia Lianqiang as Marshal Yao
 Zhang Yang as Marshal Li
 Li Qingxi as Guo Shen
 Song Yujiao as Zhijian
 Fu Tianwu as Judge
 Wang Feng as Ox Head Guard
 Shui Jiajun as Horse Face Guard
 Zhang Xuan as Stable keeper
 Li Zongxian as Stable keeper
 Shi Zhenfei as Little Zhang Crown Prince
 Zhao Zhendong as Yellow Dress Robber
 Mao Jianping as Granny of Wind
 Zheng Jianfan as Boy Who Pushes Clouds

List of featured songs
 Tage Xixing (踏歌西行; Singing on a Journey to the West), the opening theme song, performed by Tengger.
 Wo Xin Bu Bian (我心不变; My Heart Does Not Change), the ending theme song, performed by Tan Jing.
 Xi You Ge (西游歌; Song of a Journey to the West), an alternate ending theme song, performed by Fei Zhenxiang, Victor Chen, Xie Ning and Mou Fengbin.
 Guose Tianxiang Jinzai Xiliang (国色天香尽在西凉; All the Beauties Are in Xiliang) performed by Black Ducks Group.
 Randeng Zhi Ge (燃灯之歌; Song of Lighting a Lamp) performed by Wang Like
 Xin Si Lianhua Kai (心似莲花开; Heart Opens Like a Lotus Blossoming) performed by Victor Chen

International broadcast
  In Sri Lanka, the drama began airing in late 2016 on Rupavahini dubbed in Sinhalese under the title, Maha Wanara.

See also
 Journey to the West (2011 TV series)
 List of media adaptations of Journey to the West

References

External links

Television shows based on Journey to the West
2010 Chinese television series debuts
2010 Chinese television series endings
Television about fairies and sprites
Demons in television